South Chicago (93rd Street) station is a Metra Electric Line station on East 93rd St and South Baltimore Avenue (9300 S, 3300 E) in Chicago's South Chicago neighborhood. The station provides transport services to Chicago's South Chicago, South Deering, Hegewisch, and East Side neighborhoods. , South Chicago (93rd Street) is the 101st busiest of Metra's 236 non-downtown stations, with an average of 472 weekday boardings.

The South Chicago Branch, a  spur line, was built for the Illinois Central Railroad (IC). The IC operated the South Chicago Branch from startup in 1883 until the line was sold, with the rest of Metra Electric, to the public sector in 1987. The line was electrified in 1926. In 2001, Metra built the 93rd Street terminus as a replacement for the  91st Street (South Chicago) terminal.  

This station is the only outbound Metra terminus located within the corporate limits of the city of Chicago. It is 6 blocks south of the 87th Street Metra Electric South Chicago Branch station. Travel time to Van Buren/Jackson Street station in Downtown Chicago is about 35 minutes.

A station typology adopted by the Chicago Plan Commission on October 16, 2014 assigns the South Chicago 93rd Street station a typology of Local Activity Center. A Local Activity Center is primarily characterized by the Metra station being the central focus of a built-up and identifiable neighborhood.

Bus connections
CTA
 N5 South Shore Night Bus
 26 South Shore Express
 30 South Chicago
 71 71st/South Shore
 87 87th 
 95 95th

References

External links

92nd Street entrance from Google Maps Street View
93rd Street entrance from Google Maps Street View

Metra stations in Chicago
Railway stations in the United States opened in 2001
2001 establishments in Illinois